Success & Failure is the fifth studio album by rapper Chingy, it was released on September 7, 2010.
The project can be downloaded on ITunes, Amazon Music, Google Play Music.

Track listing
The track listing was confirmed by Amazon.com.

References

2010 albums
Albums produced by Big Hollis
Chingy albums
Real Talk Entertainment albums